Stienta is a comune (municipality) in the Province of Rovigo in the Italian region Veneto, located about  southwest of Venice and about  southwest of Rovigo.

The municipality of Stienta contains the frazioni (subdivisions, mainly villages and hamlets) Argine Sabato, Argine Valle Est, Argine Valle Ovest, Beccari, Bentivoglio, Boaria Gilliola, Boaria Guerra, Boaria Roveta, Boaria Val dell'Oca e Casetta, Boaria Val di Mezzo, Boaria Varotta, Brigo, Chiavicone, Fazzenda, Folega, Guratti, Ponte Favarzano, Prati Nuovi, Sabbioni, and Zampine.

Stienta borders the following municipalities: Bagnolo di Po, Castelguglielmo, Ferrara, Fiesso Umbertiano, Gaiba, Occhiobello.

Demographic evolution

References

External links
 www.comune.stienta.ro.it/

Cities and towns in Veneto